Loveitt is a surname. Notable people with the surname include:

 Frank Loveitt (1871–1939), English cricketer
 Herbert Loveitt (1874–1909), British rugby union player and Olympian

See also
 Lovett (surname)